Schemers is a 2019 Scottish film written by Dave McLean & Kyle Titterton, based on Dave's early life in Dundee, prior to becoming the manager of Placebo.

It was released in the UK and Ireland on 25 September 2020.

Plot
In 1979 Dundee, Davie sets out to become a gig promoter. His ambition is threatened by a run-in with a local gangster who owns all the venues. To succeed he must pull off an Iron Maiden gig.

Cast
Conor Berry as Davie
Sean Connor as Scot
Grant Robert Keelan as John
Tara Lee as Shona
Kit Clark as Wullie McClean
Blair Robertson as Pike
Mingus Johnston as Kenny
Paula Masterton as Anne
Carolyn Bonnyman as Moyra
Alastair Thomson Mills as Fergie
Reanne Farley as Chrissy

Reception
On Rotten Tomatoes, the film has  approval rating, based on  reviews.

References

External links
 
 

2019 films
2019 comedy films
2019 independent films
British independent films
English-language Scottish films
Films set in Scotland
Films shot in Scotland
Scottish comedy films
2010s English-language films
2010s British films